Cochylimorpha hapala is a species of moth of the family Tortricidae. It is found in China (Hong Kong) and on Borneo.

References

Moths described in 1984
Cochylimorpha
Moths of Asia